Soch is a 2002 Hindi-language film. 

Soch may also refer to:
 Swedish Open Cultural Heritage (SOCH), a web service used to search and fetch data from any organization that holds information or pictures related to the Swedish cultural heritage
 Soch Kraal (1782–1854), Kashmiri poet
 Soch, a song by Indian singer Hardy Sandhu

See also 
 Szűcs, a Hungarian name (including a list of persons with the name)